Pedasí Airport  is an airport serving the town of Pedasí, in Panama.

It replaces the original Cap.

Airlines and destinations

See also

Transport in Panama
List of airports in Panama

References

External links
OpenStreetMap - Pedasi
OurAirports - Capt Justiniano Montenegro Airport
YouTube - Landing at Pedasi
Google Earth

Airports in Panama
Los Santos Province